Patrik Abrahám (born 10 December 1991) is a Slovak footballer who last played Pohronie, in the 2. Liga, as a midfielder.

Career

Spartak Myjava
Abrahám made his professional debut for Spartak Myjava against FC ViOn Zlaté Moravce on 16 July 2016.

MFK Skalica
MFK Skalica announced the signing of Abrahám in July 2018, but he left the club again at the end of the year.

FK Pohronie
After his departure from Skalica, he re-joined FK Pohronie, in January 2019. A club from his region of origin. Pohronie topped the league table of 2. Liga before the winter break. The success of the squad encouraged departure of multiple leading players, particularly to Železiarne Podbrezová, where one of Pohronie's administrative team had moved, or even to Poland. Abrahám was therefore brought as the replacement.

During the autumn of 2020 Abrahám was relegated to the B-team by Miroslav Filipko, the sporting director, amidst accusations of racism. During the winter he departed from Pohronie and joined KFC Komárno of 2. Liga.

After a 1.5 year long spell with Komárno, Abrahám returned to Pohronie as a part of Spät ku koreňom (Back to Roots) campaign.

References

External links
Eurofotbal profile 
 
Futbalnet Profile 

1991 births
Living people
Slovak footballers
Association football midfielders
FK Dubnica players
FK Pohronie players
Spartak Myjava players
FC Nitra players
MFK Skalica players
KFC Komárno players
2. Liga (Slovakia) players
Slovak Super Liga players